Never Cry Werewolf is a Canadian television film directed by Brenton Spencer, and starring Nina Dobrev, Peter Stebbings and Kevin Sorbo. It premiered on the Sci Fi Channel on May 11, 2008.

Plot 
When 16-year-old Loren (Nina Dobrev) and her family greet a new neighbor, Jared (Peter Stebbings), a good-looking single guy and his dog, she senses something mysterious and dangerous about him. Her suspicions become further aroused when some of the locals begin disappearing one by one. As Loren becomes obsessed with her neighbor's behavior, she is unaware that he is monitoring her just as closely as a hungry wolf stalking its prey at night. Because Loren reminds her neighbor of his young and deceased wife, Melissa, he claims her as his territory and kills her friend Angie, who seems to be close to her. With the help of local TV hunting show personality Redd Tucker (Kevin Sorbo) and a delivery boy with a secret crush on attractive Loren, the unlikely trio prepare for a full-moon showdown against an immortal creature with insatiable bloodlust.  Jared also has Loren's brother locked inside a freezer. It's her brother's life for hers.

Cast

Production

Release 
It aired on the Sci Fi Channel on May 11, 2008.

Soundtrack 
Most of the songs in the film were written and performed by Canadian band The Manvils. The Manvils T-shirts are also worn by various members of the cast throughout the movie itself.

Reception

References

External links 
  via web.archive.org
 

2008 television films
English-language Canadian films
2008 horror films
Canadian horror television films
Canadian independent films
Canadian werewolf films
2008 films
Films directed by Brenton Spencer
2000s Canadian films